Ahmed Santos may refer to:
 Ahmed Santos (newspaper columnist) (born 1974), newspaper columnist and former boxer
 Ahmed Santos (militant), convert to Islam; apprehended in Philippines for planning terrorist activities